Betzdorf may refer to:

Betzdorf, Luxembourg, a village and municipality in Luxembourg
Betzdorf, Germany, a town and municipality in Rhineland-Palatinate
Betzdorf (Verbandsgemeinde), a former collective municipality whose seat was Betzdorf, Germany

, a number of ships with this name